Sun Le may refer to:

Sun Le (footballer) (born 1989), Chinese football goalkeeper
Sun Le (goalball) (born 1993), Chinese goalball player